Andal was a poet-saint of South India.

Andal may also refer to:

 Andal, Paschim Bardhaman, a census town in West Bengal, India
 Andal (community development block), an administrative division
 Andal (crater), a crater on Mercury
 Andals, a fictional ethnic group in A Song of Ice and Fire book series by George R. R. Martin and the TV series Game of Thrones

People with the name
 Andal Ampatuan Sr., the patriarch of the Ampatuan political family in the Philippines
 Andal Ampatuan Jr. (born 1960), the former mayor of Datu Unsay, Maguindanao in the Philippines
 Andal Priyadarshini, Tamil poet, lyricist, and writer
 Andal Venkatasubba Rao, Indian educationist
 Dean Andal (born 1959), American public official and businessman

See also

Antal (given name)
Antal (surname)